Golds may refer to:

 Golds (ethnic group), a Tungusic people of the Far East
 Golds (jewelry), a type of jewelry worn over the teeth
 Golds (surname), an Australian surname

See also

 Gold (disambiguation)